The Revelstoke Grizzlies are a Junior "B" Ice Hockey team based in Revelstoke, British Columbia, Canada. They are members of the Doug Birks Division of the Okanagan/Shuswap Conference of the Kootenay International Junior Hockey League (KIJHL). They play their home games at Revelstoke Forum.

History
The Grizzlies were founded in 1993. They have won the KIJHL Championship 4 times, in 1998, 2010, 2019, and 2022. 

In the 2009-10 season, they not only won their Division, and KIJHL championship over the Leafs 4-1, but they went to the Cyclone Taylor Cup and won Gold. They then went onto win the Western Canadian Junior B championship, the Keystone Cup.

On June 11, 2014, it was announced that the Grizzlies ownership had been transferred to a new group headed by Ryan Parent.

Season-by-season record

Note: GP = Games played, W = Wins, L = Losses, T = Ties, OTL = Overtime Losses, SOL = Shootout Losses, D = Defaults, Pts = Points, GF = Goals for, GA = Goals against

Playoffs

Records as of March 3, 2023.

 Notes

 Prior to the 2001-02 KIJHL playoffs, there was three rounds only (Division Semifinals, Division Finals and Finals).

Cyclone Taylor Cup
British Columbia Jr. B Provincial Hockey Championships

Keystone CupWESTERN CANADA, Jr. B National Championships'''

Records as of April 18, 2010.

Awards and trophies
Top Defenseman
Caleb Roy: 2009-2010
Caleb Roy (Overall Winner): 2009-2010
Shawn Shackleton: 2007-2008
2014-15 Nii Noi Tetteh

Most Sportsmanlike
Faiz Khan: 2009-2010
Faiz Khan (Overall Winner): 2009-2010

Coach of the Year
Troy Mick: 2009-2010
Troy Mick (Overall Winner): 2009-2010
Brad Fox: 2006-2007Top Goaltender
Andrew Parent: 2009-2010
Jordan Barry: 2007-2008
2014-15 Aidan Doak

Rookie of the Year
David Skagen: 2007-2008
2014-15 Steven Fiust

References 

Steven fiust

External links
Official website of the Revelstoke Grizzlies

Ice hockey teams in British Columbia
Revelstoke, British Columbia
1993 establishments in British Columbia
Ice hockey clubs established in 1993